Strombinoturris is a genus of sea snails, marine gastropod mollusks in the family Clathurellidae.

Species
Species within the genus Strombinoturris include:
 Strombinoturris crockeri Hertlein & Strong, 1951

References

External links
  Bouchet, P.; Kantor, Y. I.; Sysoev, A.; Puillandre, N. (2011). A new operational classification of the Conoidea (Gastropoda). Journal of Molluscan Studies. 77(3): 273-308

 
Gastropod genera